Hans Wilhelm (18 October 1904 – 23 December 1980) was a German screenwriter. Wilhelm was of Jewish heritage, and was forced to emigrate following the Nazi takeover in 1933. After going into exile he worked in a variety of countries including Britain, France, and Turkey before eventually settling in the United States. He later returned to work in West Germany following the Second World War.

Selected filmography 
 Nick, King of the Chauffeurs (dir. Carl Wilhelm, 1925)
 My Aunt, Your Aunt (1927)
 Violantha (dir. Carl Froelich, 1928)
 The Fourth from the Right (dir. Conrad Wiene, 1929)
 German Wine (dir. Carl Froelich, 1929)
 The Last Fort (dir. Curtis Bernhardt, 1929)
 Diary of a Coquette (dir. Constantin J. David, 1929)
 Sinful and Sweet (dir. Karel Lamač, 1929)
 The Last Company (dir. Curtis Bernhardt, 1930)
 A Student's Song of Heidelberg (dir. Karl Hartl, 1930)
 Queen of the Night (dir. Fritz Wendhausen, 1931)
 Berlin-Alexanderplatz (dir. Phil Jutzi, 1931)
 You Don't Forget Such a Girl (dir. Fritz Kortner, 1932)
 No Money Needed (dir. Carl Boese, 1932)
 Companion Wanted (dir. Joe May, 1932)
 Two in a Car (dir. Joe May, 1932)
 Thea Roland (dir. Henry Koster, 1932)
 There Is Only One Love (1933)
 Liebelei (dir. Max Ophüls, 1933)
 Everybody's Woman (dir. Max Ophüls, 1934)
 The Dictator (dir. Victor Saville, 1935)
 Under Western Eyes (dir. Marc Allégret, 1936)
 Bank Holiday (dir. Carol Reed, 1938)
 Prison Without Bars (dir. Brian Desmond Hurst, 1938)
 The Novel of Werther (dir. Max Ophüls, 1938)
 Conflict (dir. Léonide Moguy, 1938)
 Beating Heart (dir. Henri Decoin, 1940)
 There's No Tomorrow (1939)
 Spy for a Day (dir. Mario Zampi, 1940)
 The Thirteen Heroes (dir. Şadan Kâmil, 1943) - Remake of The Last Company (1930)
 I Am a Fugitive (dir. Miguel M. Delgado, 1946)
 Heartbeat (dir. Sam Wood, 1946) - Remake of Beating Heart (1940)
 On an Island with You (dir. Richard Thorpe, 1948)
 Once a Thief (dir. W. Lee Wilder, 1950) 
 The Prowler (dir. Joseph Losey, 1951)
 No Time for Flowers (dir. Don Siegel, 1952)
 The Csardas King (1958)
 Christine (dir. Pierre Gaspard-Huit, 1958) - Remake of Liebelei (1933)
 Bombs on Monte Carlo (dir. Georg Jacoby, 1960)
 Five Golden Hours (dir. Mario Zampi, 1961)
 Dime with a Halo (dir. Boris Sagal, 1963)
  (dir. Wolfgang Staudte, 1966)

References

Bibliography 
 Prawer, S.S. Between Two Worlds: The Jewish Presence in German and Austrian Film, 1910-1933. Berghahn Books, 2005.

External links 
 

1904 births
1980 deaths
German male screenwriters
Film people from Berlin
German male writers
Jewish emigrants from Nazi Germany to the United States
20th-century German screenwriters